The 2011 Milan Kosanovic Cup is an international rugby league tournament played in Eastern Europe The competing teams are the Russia Bears, Ukraine and Serbia.

The 2011 tournament is the inaugural staging of the Milan Kosanovic Cup.

Squads

Russia

Ukraine

Serbia

Round 1

Ukraine vs Russia

Round 2

Serbia vs Ukraine

Round 3

Serbia vs Russia

References

Milan Kosanovic Cup